Euthyrrhapha (or Enthyrrhapha), is a genus of sand cockroaches in the family Corydiidae. It is the only genus in the subfamily Euthyrrhaphinae. Members of this genus have been found throughout South America, Africa, as well as on the Hawaiian islands. Like many other genera within their family, they are terrestrial, nocturnal, and exhibit hemimetabolism.

References 

Cockroach genera